Pungcheon No clan was one of the Korean clans. Their Bon-gwan was in Kwail County, South Hwanghae Province. According to the research in 2015, the number of Pungcheon No clan was 45200.

See also 
 Korean clan names of foreign origin

References

External links 
 

 
Korean clan names of Chinese origin